Coleophora jefreniensis is a moth of the family Coleophoridae. It is found in Tunisia and on Malta.

References

jefreniensis
Moths described in 1954
Moths of Africa
Moths of Europe